John E. Bird (1862–1928) was a member of the Michigan Supreme Court from 1910 to 1928.

Bird was born in Clayton, Michigan.  Bird graduated from Adrian College.  He was admitted to the bar and in 1894 was elected prosecuting attorney for Lenawee County.  He served in this position until 1899.

In 1905 Bird was elected the Attorney General.  He served in this position until 1910.  While in this position he was involved in litigation over the methods of taxing the railroad.

Bird was appointed to the Michigan Supreme Court by Governor Fred M. Warner.  He was re-elected to the court three times, and was still serving on the court at the time of his death.

Sources
bio of Bird

1862 births
1928 deaths
Adrian College alumni
Justices of the Michigan Supreme Court
Michigan Attorneys General
19th-century American lawyers
20th-century American lawyers
20th-century American politicians
20th-century American judges